Piaxtla (municipality) is a town and municipality in Puebla in south-eastern Mexico.1000

See also
Piaxtla River

References

Municipalities of Puebla